The R662 road is a regional road in Ireland, located in County Limerick and County Tipperary.

References

Regional roads in the Republic of Ireland
Roads in County Limerick
Roads in County Tipperary